Edward Ingram may refer to:

Eddie Ingram (1910–1973), Irish cricketer
Maurice Ingram (Edward Maurice Berkeley Ingram, 1890–1941), British diplomat and civil servant
Edward Ingram (historian) (born 1940), Anglo-Canadian historian

See also
Ed Ingram (born 1999), American football player